Said Arikat (born ) is a Palestinian journalist and the Washington bureau chief for Jerusalem based newspaper Al-Quds. Arikat also teaches as an adjunct professor at the American University. From 2005 to 2010, Arikat served as the spokesperson for the United Nations Assistance Mission for Iraq.

A long time attendee of press briefings at the U.S. State Department, Arikat has been noted for his sometimes contentious exchanges with State Department Spokespersons, including John Kirby, Heather Nauert, and Ned Price. Some have criticized Arikat for pushing a Palestinian point of view, with Charles Bybelezer of the Jewish News Syndicate saying that Arikat "routinely bashes Israel [...] at U.S. State Department briefings", a point of view that Philip Weiss of Mondoweiss described as "smear[ing] by the Zionist press". Yisrael Medad opined in The Jerusalem Post that Arikat asks legitimate questions, but gives them an ideological slant.

On 3 December 2022, Arikat's Twitter account was suspended for unknown reasons. On 29 December 2022, the suspension was lifted.

Arikat has appeared on Al Jazeera, C-SPAN, NBC News, and PBS. Arikat has also written for Dubai based newspaper Gulf News.

References

External links 
 
 

Palestinian reporters and correspondents
Living people
Year of birth missing (living people)